Men's Slalom World Cup 1968/1969

Final point standings
Points were only awarded for top ten finishes (see scoring system).

Men's Slalom
FIS Alpine Ski World Cup slalom men's discipline titles